The Industrial Hemp Farming Act of 2009, introduced during the 111th United States Congress by House 
Republican Ron Paul of Texas) and House Democrat Barney Frank of Massachusetts) on April 2, 2009, sought to clarify the differences between marijuana and industrial hemp as well as repeal federal laws that prohibit cultivation of industrial, but only for research facilities of higher education from conducting research. Industrial hemp is the non-psychoactive, low-THC, oil-seed and fibers varieties of, predominantly, the cannabis sativa plant. Hemp is a sustainable resource that can be used to create thousands of different products including fuel, fabrics, paper, household products, and food and has been used for hundreds of centuries by civilizations around the world.  If H.R.1866 passes American farmers will be permitted to compete in global hemp markets.  On March 10, 2009, both Paul and Frank wrote a letter to their Congressional colleagues urging them to support the legislation.  This bill was previously introduced in 2005 under the title of Industrial Hemp Farming Act of 2005.

The bill

To amend the Controlled Substances Act to exclude industrial hemp from the definition of marijuana, and for other purposes.

Be it enacted by the Senate and House of Representatives of the United States of America in Congress assembled,
SECTION 1. SHORT TITLE.

This Act may be cited as the `Industrial Hemp Farming Act of 2009'.
SEC. 2. EXCLUSION OF INDUSTRIAL HEMP FROM DEFINITION OF MARIJUANA.

Paragraph (16) of section 102 of the Controlled Substances Act (21 U.S.C. 802(16)) is amended--
(1) by striking `(16)' at the beginning and inserting `(16)(A)'; and
(2) by adding at the end the following new subparagraph:
`(B) The term `marihuana' does not include industrial hemp. As used in the preceding sentence, the term `industrial hemp' means the plant Cannabis sativa L. and any part of such plant, whether growing or not, with a delta-9 tetrahydrocannabinol concentration that does not exceed 0.3 percent on a dry weight basis.'.
SEC. 3. INDUSTRIAL HEMP DETERMINATION TO BE MADE BY STATES.

Section 201 of the Controlled Substances Act (21 U.S.C. 811) is amended by adding at the end the following new subsection:
`(i) Industrial Hemp Determination To Be Made by States- In any criminal action, civil action, or administrative proceeding, a State regulating the growing and processing of industrial hemp under State law shall have exclusive authority to determine whether any such plant meets the concentration limitation set forth in subparagraph (B) of paragraph (16) of section 102 and such determination shall be conclusive and binding.'

History

The Marihuana Tax Act of 1937 is the beginning of constriction for the growth of marijuana in the United States. An extremely high tax was placed on marijuana; making it nearly impossible to grow industrial hemp. However, congress expected the production of industrial hemp to continue, but the Federal Bureau of Narcotics lumped industrial hemp with marijuana and its successor, the US Drug Enforcement Administration, continued.

Industrial hemp is now legal in the U.S., which advocates hope could eventually loosen laws around the popular marijuana extract CBD.

President Donald Trump signed the 2018 United States farm bill on December 20, 2018, which legalized hemp — a variety of cannabis that does not produce the psychoactive component of marijuana — paving the way to legitimacy for an agricultural sector that has been operating on the fringe of the law. Industrial hemp has a potential multibillion-dollar market for cannabidiol, or CBD, a non-psychoactive compound that has started to turn up in beverages, health products and pet snacks, among other products.

United States companies and industries which sell products made with hemp include  Dr. Bronner's Magic Soaps, most of the bird seed sold in the U.S., and even the automobile companies Ford and BMW, historically and currently, experimented with hemp materials in their vehicles. Hemp food manufacturers such as French Meadow Bakery, Hempzels, Living Harvest, Nature's Path and Nutiva now make their products from Canadian hemp. These industries will no longer have to import hemp from other countries to produce these products.

National drug control policies opposed this legislation as it was believed that hemp plants could provide cover during cultivation for marijuana plants.

Ruling of proposed bill

This legislation, the Industrial Hemp Farming Act of 2005 and the Industrial Hemp Farming Act of 2007, were introduced, referred to committee, and no additional legislative action taken.

Etymology

Currently, the word "marijuana" is the accepted spelling. However, "marihuana" was the correct spelling and most commonly used form in early Federal Government of the United States documents. That is why, as stated in the bill, marijuana is spelled "marihuana;" to maintain consistency across government documents.

See also

 Cannabis in the United States
 Legal history of cannabis in the United States
Gonzales v. Raich
Medical marijuana
States' rights

References

Further reading

External links
H.R. 1866 at THOMAS
H.R. 1866: Industrial Hemp Farming Act of 2009 at GovTrack
H.R.1866 - Industrial Hemp Farming Act of 2009 at OpenCongress

Proposed legislation of the 111th United States Congress
Cannabis law reform in the United States
Hemp agriculture in the United States
Drug control law in the United States
2009 in cannabis